"Upside Down" is a song written and produced by Chic members Nile Rodgers and Bernard Edwards. It was recorded by American singer Diana Ross and issued on June 18, 1980 from Motown as the lead single from her eleventh studio album, Diana (1980). The song hit number one on the Billboard Hot 100 chart on September 6, 1980 and stayed there for four weeks. It also hit number one on the Billboard Disco and Soul charts. The single was released a full four weeks after the album was released.

"Upside Down" was also a big hit internationally, topping the singles charts in Australia, Denmark, New Zealand, Sweden, South Africa, Italy, Norway, Switzerland, while peaking at No. 5 in Canada. It also rose to No. 2 on the UK Singles Chart, marking the highest peak performance from Ross as a solo artist since "I'm Still Waiting" in 1971. It also earned her a British Phonographic Industry silver disc award for sales in excess of 250,000 copies. The single earned Ross her ninth career Grammy Award nomination for Best Female R&B Vocal Performance, losing to "Never Knew Love Like This Before" by Stephanie Mills at the 1981 Grammy Awards.

"Upside Down" is listed at No. 80 on Billboard "Hot 100 60th Anniversary" (1958–2018).

Background and recording
The song was written by Bernard Edwards and Nile Rodgers (of the band Chic).

In a 2011 interview, Nile Rodgers said "Diana Ross was the first big star we ever worked with and we took it very seriously." Rodgers and Edwards interviewed her for several days. "This was the first time in her life somebody cared about who she was; what she was — everyone previously had treated her the way we had treated Sister Sledge — they got her in and said 'Sing this'. We (took a more personal approach)."

As would be widely reported later, their studio liaison with Ross was not a success. She disliked the results of their sessions and gave them specific remixing instructions; they made slight changes and suggested that if she still did not like them, she could get them remixed herself. Ross did so, reworking the whole album with Motown producer Russ Terrana to downplay the funk element and make her voice more prominent.

Rodgers and Edwards were initially furious, and considered having their production credit removed. They eventually decided to leave the track unedited, as the sound they used for Chic remained heavily influential on the album. The LP became a platinum-selling No. 1 that spent a year on the American chart. Ross left Motown soon afterwards for RCA.

Charts

Weekly charts

Year-end charts

All-time charts

Certifications and sales

Live performances
Ross performed the song live in 1981 during her television special Diana, with her labelmate Michael Jackson joining her onstage towards the end of the song. In 1997, Ross performed the song live with English funk and acid jazz band Jamiroquai at the Brit Awards ceremony.

In film, television and commercials
In 2013, the song was used in a Mercedes-Benz commercial featuring chickens being moved around while their heads remain stationary as an example of the car brand's "magic body control." It was also used by Jaguar Cars in a parody of the Mercedes-Benz commercial. In 2023, the song is heard on Nutella.

Influence and legacy
Contemporary jazz/fusion group Pieces of a Dream covered the song on their 2001 album Acquainted with the Night. Hip-hop rapper MC Lyte sampled "Upside Down" on her 1996 hit "Cold Rock a Party (Remix)", featuring Missy Elliott and Puff Daddy. In the follwing year, female rap duo Salt-N-Pepa covered the song for the Space Jam soundtrack. In 2003, Swedish band Alcazar interpolated the melody for their song "This Is the World We Live In", released in 2004.

Risquée version

In 1999, the music group Risquée covered the song. Their version peaked at No. 25 in France and at No. 76 in Germany.

Track listings
CD maxi
Upside Down (Single Cut) – 3:30
Upside Down (Club Version) – 4:32
Enjoy Your Life – 3:12
Enjoy Your Life (Long Version) – 4:56

Charts

See also
List of number-one singles in Australia during the 1980s
List of Billboard Hot 100 number ones of 1980
List of Cash Box Top 100 number-one singles of 1980
List of European number-one hits of 1980
List of number-one hits of 1980 (Italy)
List of number-one singles from the 1980s (New Zealand)
List of number-one singles and albums in Sweden
List of number-one singles of the 1980s
List of number-one dance singles of 1980 (U.S.)
List of Hot Soul Singles number ones of 1980
VG-lista 1964 to 1994

References

External links

1980 songs
1980 singles
1999 singles
Diana Ross songs
Billboard Hot 100 number-one singles
Cashbox number-one singles
European Hot 100 Singles number-one singles
Motown singles
Number-one singles in Australia
Number-one singles in Denmark
Number-one singles in Italy
Number-one singles in New Zealand
Number-one singles in Norway
Number-one singles in South Africa
Number-one singles in Sweden
Number-one singles in Switzerland
Song recordings produced by Bernard Edwards
Song recordings produced by Nile Rodgers
Songs written by Bernard Edwards
Songs written by Nile Rodgers